Lana Clelland (born 26 January 1993) is a Scottish professional footballer who plays for Sassuolo Femminile in the Italian women's Serie A and the Scotland women's national team.

Club career
Born in Perth, Clelland began her career at local clubs (playing alongside future international teammate Lisa Evans) before joining Rangers where she made her senior Scottish Women's Premier League debut. Clelland joined Spartans during the 2011 summer break.

In December 2014, she signed a professional contract with ASD Pink Bari in the Italian women's Serie A. 
In summer 2015 Clelland transferred to UPC Tavagnacco and in 2016–17 was the highest goal scorer in the Serie A, emulating her compatriot Rose Reilly. After her 2017–18 season was disrupted by a heel injury, Clelland joined Fiorentina in July 2018. In her first season with La Viola, the team defeated reigning league champions Juventus to win the Supercoppa, but lost the Coppa Italia final and finished runners-up in Serie A to the same opponents.

Clelland moved to Sassuolo Femminile in July 2021.

International career
Clelland has appeared for the Scotland women's national team at all age group levels beginning with the under-15 side in 2008. Having continued as a prolific scorer at under-19 level, she made her full Scotland debut in July 2012 against Cameroon. She was selected in the Scotland squads for the UEFA Women's Euro 2017 and 2019 FIFA Women's World Cup tournaments.

International goals
Results list Scotland's goal tally first.

References

External links

UEFA profile

1993 births
Living people
Scottish women's footballers
Scotland women's international footballers
Footballers from Perth, Scotland
Serie A (women's football) players
Scottish expatriate women's footballers
U.P.C. Tavagnacco players
Fiorentina Women's F.C. players
Expatriate women's footballers in Italy
Scottish expatriate sportspeople in Italy
Women's association football forwards
A.S.D. Pink Sport Time players
Spartans W.F.C. players
2019 FIFA Women's World Cup players
U.S. Sassuolo Calcio (women) players
UEFA Women's Euro 2017 players